Ben Denis Unwin (15 August 1977 – 14 August 2019) was an Australian actor and music video director, best known for portraying Jesse McGregor on the television soap opera Home and Away from 1996 until 2000, and again from 2002 to 2005. For his portrayal of Jesse, Unwin in 1997 was nominated for the Logie Award for Most Popular New Talent. and for a British National Television Award for Most Popular Newcomer. 

Unwin, as a music video director, directed clips for Boy George and Culture Club. 

After Home and Away, Unwin completed a law degree and worked as a senior solicitor in Sydney and then in Newcastle. 

Unwin was found dead on 14 August 2019, one day shy of his 42nd birthday, at his home in Minyon Falls, west of Byron Bay, which according to Australian Aboriginal religion and mythology, is "cursed" and has "bad spirits". Police are not treating his death, which was reported on 20 August 2019, as suspicious.

Filmography

References

External links

Australian male television actors
Male actors from Sydney
1977 births
2019 deaths